James William Baskin (January 4, 1920 – January 8, 1999) was a Canadian politician, businessman and lumberman. He was elected to the House of Commons of Canada as a Member of the Progressive Conservative Party to represent the riding of Renfrew South in the 1957 federal election. He was re-elected in 1958 and 1962.

The son of James Robert Baskin and Ethel Gill, he was educated in Norwood. In 1940, he married Gladys L. Scott. Baskin operated a wholesale lumber business in Renfrew.

He lost in the elections of 1963, 1965 and 1968, the latter in which he was a candidate for the riding of Lanark and Renfrew. Prior to his federal political experience, he served in World War II in the Royal Canadian Air Force for five years.

References

External links
 

1920 births
1999 deaths
Members of the House of Commons of Canada from Ontario
Progressive Conservative Party of Canada MPs